"Pittsburgh, Pennsylvania" also known as "There's a Pawn Shop on the Corner" or "There's a Pawn Shop on the Corner in Pittsburgh, Pennsylvania" is a popular song, written by Bob Merrill in 1952.

The best-known version was recorded by Guy Mitchell on January 15, 1952. This recording was released by Columbia Records as catalog number 39663, with the flip side "Doll with a Sawdust Heart." It first reached the Billboard chart on March 7, 1952, and lasted 17 weeks on the chart, peaking at number 6.

Bing Crosby sang the song on a number of occasions on his radio show in 1952, and one of these versions has since been released on CD. Mickey Katz released a comedic parody titled "Schvitzburgh, Pennsylvania."

The song is a story about how a relatively poor man falls in love with a beautiful woman, and convinces her how rich he is by taking her out to fancy places, paying for it all by pawning all he has. As the song opens, he is out of things to pawn.

Appearances in other media 
The song was referenced in Robert A. Heinlein's Time Enough for Love. The Senior sings a verse while he is in rejuvenation.

References

Songs written by Bob Merrill
Guy Mitchell songs
1952 songs
1952 singles
Columbia Records singles
Song recordings produced by Mitch Miller